The Chief Magistrate is a judicial officer in the government of Fiji, who presides over the Magistrates Courts.

The following persons have held office as Chief Magistrate (this is an incomplete list):

Apaitia Seru
Sekove Naqiolevu 
Sailesi Temo
Naomi Matanitobua
Usaia Ratuvili

Judiciary of Fiji